SuperTuxKart (STK) is a free and open-source kart racing game, distributed under the terms of the GNU General Public License, version 3. It features mascots of various open-source projects. SuperTuxKart is cross-platform, running on Linux, macOS, Windows, iOS (beta), Android systems and Nintendo Switch (homebrew).

SuperTuxKart started as a fork of TuxKart, originally developed by Steve and Oliver Baker in 2000. When TuxKart's development ended around March 2004, a fork as SuperTuxKart was conducted by other developers in 2006. SuperTuxKart is under active development by the game's community.

Gameplay 

SuperTuxKart gameplay is similar to that of the Mario Kart series, but also has distinct elements, such as collecting and using cans of Nitro. The game features the mascots of several open source projects. For example, Mozilla Thunderbird plays the referee, flagging the start of the race and saving players when they drive off the course. The game supports single player, local multiplayer, WAN multiplayer, and LAN multiplayer modes. Networking modes were introduced in version 1.0.

Characters 
The official playable characters of SuperTuxKart are the mascots of free and open-source projects. The character Nolok does not represent a particular open source project, but was created by the SuperTux project as the antagonist of Tux. The mascots for many other projects are available as add-ons from SuperTuxKart's add-ons website.

Plot 
Unlike Mario Kart, STK has a story associated with gameplay, similar to Crash Team Racing.
Story mode is used to unlock tracks and characters for single and multi-player modes.
At the beginning of story mode, Gnu, the leader of the free/libre and open-source world, is captured by Nolok, the villain in STK, with his spaceship. Nolok then visits Tux and tells him that he has kidnapped Gnu; unless Tux and his friends can defeat Nolok, the 'King of the Karts', Gnu would become his supper. After the player defeats Nolok in Fort Magma, the final track of STK, Tux rescues Gnu from his prison.

History 

SuperTuxKart is based on TuxKart, a project initiated by Steve Baker in April 2000. Due to internal disagreements in the TuxKart project, development stalled. The project ultimately collapsed and was abandoned in March 2004. The project was forked as SuperTuxKart, but remained in an unplayable and unmaintained state. In 2006 Joerg "Hiker" Henrichs resurrected the project and, with the help of Eduardo "Coz" Hernandez Munoz, released the game in a playable state. In 2008, Marianne Gagnon (aka. "Auria") joined the project and eventually replaced Coz as one of the project leaders after his retirement.

Historically licensed under version 2 of the GPL, in 2008 the game's source code was relicensed to the GPLv3. The game's assets (textures, models, sounds, music, etc.) are licensed under a mixture of free content and DFSG conforming licenses: GPL, CC BY, CC BY-SA, and Public Domain.

In 2010, SuperTuxKart switched away from using SDL and PLIB libraries (used through version 0.6.2) for graphics and started using the Irrlicht Engine. This change was released in version 0.7. In 2013 and 2014, the game participated in Google Summer of Code as a mentoring organization. The migration of the code repository from SourceForge to GitHub was officially announced on 17 January 2014, though the assets repository and downloads remain on SourceForge. On April 21, 2015, version 0.9 was released which used a highly modified version of Irrlicht, including an entirely new graphics renderer dubbed Antarctica. This enabled much better graphics with features such as dynamic lighting, ambient occlusion, depth of field, real-time shadow mapping, and more. In early 2018, Antarctica switched to using PBR in the git version of the game. Antarctica Rendering Engine uses OpenGL 3.3+ (or OpenGL ES on suitable platforms) and GLSL for most of the graphical work.

In March 2017, SuperTuxKart was greenlit on digital distributor Steam.. However, SuperTuxKart is not yet downloadable on Steam. In May 2019, Joerg "Hiker" Henrichs stepped down as a lead developer of SuperTuxkart, with "Benau" and "Alayan" taking over as the new project leaders.

In September 2021, SuperTuxKart 1.3 was released, it has support for force feedback. Force feedback is extremely uncommon for free software games.

Reception 
In 2004, TuxKart was selected by The Linux Game Tome to be their "Game of the Month" project.
In 2007 Full Circle Magazine named SuperTuxKart as one of the top five racing games available for Linux, describing it as the game to try if you're "tired of realistic driving". Linux Journal also praised the game, saying that "the courses in SuperTuxKart are fun, colorful and imaginative" and that "If you've played the original, you'll be impressed by the new, hugely improved, SuperTuxKart." Although it did not make it into the APC Mag top five free games, it received an honorable mention in 2008. In 2009, TechRadar cited it as one of the best games to put on a Linux netbook. In 2016, OMG! Ubuntu! called SuperTuxKart "the best kart racing game to not feature Mario, Toad or Diddy Kong".

Since August 2007 SuperTuxKart has been downloaded over 3.2 million times from SourceForge.net and has over 500 thousand downloads on the Google Play store.

See also 

 List of computing mascots
List of free and open-source software packages
 List of open-source video games
 SuperTux, another game featuring Tux and friends
 Tux Racer, another racing game that features Tux

References

External links 

 

AmigaOS 4 games
AROS software
Kart racing video games
Linux games
MorphOS games
IRIX games
Multiplayer and single-player video games
Open-source video games
MacOS games
Racing video games
Software using the GPL license
Video game clones
Windows games
Creative Commons-licensed video games